Juan Ignacio Cáceres (born 31 January 1992) is an Argentine sprint canoeist who mostly competes in the four-man K-4 1000 m event. He won a bronze medal at the 2015 Pan American Games and placed 12th at the 2016 Olympics. He won the gold medal in the K-4 500m event at the 2019 Pan American Games.

Cáceres took up kayaking in 2003, and in 2012 was named Sportsperson of the Year in Las Flores, Argentina.

References

1992 births
Living people
Argentine male canoeists
Olympic canoeists of Argentina
Canoeists at the 2016 Summer Olympics
Pan American Games medalists in canoeing
Pan American Games bronze medalists for Argentina
Pan American Games gold medalists for Argentina
Canoeists at the 2015 Pan American Games
Canoeists at the 2019 Pan American Games
Medalists at the 2019 Pan American Games
Medalists at the 2015 Pan American Games
21st-century Argentine people